The Martin Luther King Bridge, of Port Arthur, Texas, is a cantilever bridge spanning the Sabine-Neches ship canal. It was opened in 1970 as the Gulfgate Bridge, and allows Texas State Highway 82, a short highway, to cross the canal and continue on Pleasure Island to the Texas-Louisiana border, connecting Port Arthur to Louisiana Highway 82.

References

External links
Maps.google.com in hybrid mode

Bridges completed in 1970
Road bridges in Texas
Cantilever bridges in the United States
Port Arthur, Texas
Buildings and structures in Jefferson County, Texas